George Fisher Comings (March 18, 1849 – June 10, 1942) was an American politician, a dairyman, an agricultural lecturer, and the 24th Lieutenant Governor of Wisconsin.

Early life
Comings was born in Greensboro, Vermont, in 1849. He moved to St. Joseph, Michigan, with his parents in 1870. In 1900, he moved to Eau Claire, Wisconsin, where he was a dairyman and bred Holstein cattle.

Career
Comings became well known as a lecturer on agricultural topics, and in 1920, he was elected the 24th Lieutenant Governor of Wisconsin. He served two terms as lieutenant governor, from January 3, 1921, to January 5, 1925. In the 1924 election, he ran for Governor of Wisconsin but lost in the Republican primary to John J. Blaine, the incumbent.

In 1927, Comings began working in the Wisconsin Department of Agriculture, and in 1928 he was made a state humane officer. He held that office until his retirement at age 91 in 1939.

Death
Comings died in 1942 in Whitehall, Wisconsin, and is buried in the Comings plot at the Saint Joseph City Cemetery in Saint Joseph, Michigan.

Family life
Son of Benjamin and Mary Comings, he married Emma Fannie Comings on October 12, 1874. They had eight children, Mary Huntington Ghiringhelli, Alice Tenney Larkin, Ellen Copeland Chambers, Benjamin Comings, Francis Comings, George H. Comings, Willard Comings, and Fannie Comings.

References

External links

1849 births
1942 deaths
Politicians from Eau Claire, Wisconsin
People from St. Joseph, Michigan
People from Orleans County, Vermont
Lieutenant Governors of Wisconsin
Wisconsin Republicans
Burials in Michigan
Leaders of the American Society of Equity